Thomas John Barnardo (4 July 184519 September 1905) was an Irish-born philanthropist and founder and director of homes for poor and deprived children. From the foundation of the first Barnardo's home in 1867 to the date of Barnardo's death, nearly 60,000 children had been taken in.

Although Barnardo never finished his studies at the London Hospital, he used the title of 'doctor' and later secured a licentiate.

Early life 
Barnardo was born in Dublin, Ireland, in 1845. He was the fourth of five children (one died in childbirth) of John Michaelis Barnardo, a furrier who was of Sephardic Jewish descent, and his second wife, Abigail, an Englishwoman and member of the Plymouth Brethren.

In the early 1840s, John emigrated from Hamburg to Dublin, where he established a business; he married twice and fathered seven children. The Barnardo family "traced its origin to Venice, followed by conversion to the Lutheran Church in the sixteenth century".  Barnardo wrote that, as a child, he was selfish and thought that everything that was not his should belong to him. However, as he grew older, he abandoned this mindset in favour of helping the poor.

Barnardo moved to London in 1866. It was during this time that he became interested in becoming a missionary.

Philanthropy 

Barnardo established 'Hope Place' ragged school in the East End of London in 1868, his first attempt at aiding the estimated 30,000 'destitute' children in Victorian London. Many of these children were not only impoverished, but orphaned, as the result of a recent cholera outbreak. For those unable to afford private education, the school offered education which although Christian-based in nature, was not exclusively religion-focused, and worked to provide tutelage on various common trades of that time (for example, newsboys and shoe-shiners).

In 1870, Barnardo was prompted to form a boys' orphanage at 18 Stepney Causeway after inspecting the conditions within which London's orphaned population slept. This was the first of 122 such establishments, caring for over 8,500 children, founded before his death in 1905. Significant provisions were available to occupants; infants/younger children were sent to rural districts in an attempt to protect them from industrial pollution, and teenagers were trained in skills such as carpentry and metal work, to provide them a form of basic financial stability.

Barnardo's homes did not just accommodate boys; in 1876 the 'Girls' Village Home' was established, and by 1905 accommodated 1,300 girls, who were trained for 'domestic occupation'. Another establishment, the 'rescue home for girls in serious danger', aimed to protect girls from the growing tide of child prostitution.

In addition to the various homes and schools established by Barnardo and his wife, Sara Louise Elmslie, a seaside retreat and hospital were also founded.

From the foundation of the homes in 1867 to the date of Barnardo's death, nearly 60,000 children had been taken in, most being trained and placed out in life.  At the time of his death, his charity was caring for over 8,500 children in 96 homes.

Personal life
In June 1873, Barnardo married Sara Louise Elmslie (1842–1944), known as Syrie, the daughter of an underwriter for Lloyd's of London.  Syrie shared her husband's interests in evangelism and social work.  The couple settled at Mossford Lodge, Essex, where they had seven children, three of whom died in early childhood.  A fourth child, Marjorie, had Down syndrome.

One daughter, Gwendolyn Maud Syrie (1879–1955), known as Syrie like her mother, was married to wealthy businessman Henry Wellcome, and later to the writer Somerset Maugham, and became a socially prominent London interior designer.

Barnardo died of angina pectoris in London on 19 September 1905, and was buried in front of Cairns House, Barkingside, Essex. The house is now the head office of the children's charity he founded, Barnardo's. A memorial stands outside Cairn's House.

Alleged Jack the Ripper suspect
At the time of the Whitechapel murders, due to the supposed medical expertise of Jack the Ripper, various doctors in the area were suspected. Long after his death, Barnardo was named a possible suspect, by Donald McCormick (1970) and Gary Rowlands (2005). Rowlands proposed that Barnardo's lonely childhood and religious zeal led him to kill prostitutes to clear them from the streets and to encourage them to place their children into his care. 
Only because of an accident in a swimming pool that left him totally deaf shortly after murdering Mary Kelly did he stop killing, as being deaf left him more vulnerable to capture. 

There is no evidence that Barnardo committed the murders, and critics of this theory have also pointed out that his age and appearance did not match any of the descriptions of the Ripper. Barnardo was well known in the East End, however, and would visit cheap boarding houses to talk to the penniless customers. During one of these visits he talked to a group at 32 Flower and Dean Street, Whitechapel, during the period of the murders. One of the women, worse for drink, cried 'We're all up to no good and no-one cares what becomes of us, perhaps some of us will be killed next.' He later viewed the body of Elizabeth Stride, Jack the Ripper's third canonical victim, at the mortuary and confirmed that she had been among those present.

Legacy – Barnardo's 

After Barnardo's death, a national memorial was instituted to form a fund of £250,000 to relieve the various institutions of all financial liability and to place the entire work on a permanent basis. William Baker, formerly the chairman of the council, was selected to succeed the founder of the homes as honorary director. Barnardo was the author of 192 books dealing with the charitable work to which he devoted his life.

Barnardo's work was carried on by his many supporters under the name Dr Barnardo's Homes. Following societal changes in the mid-20th century, the charity changed its focus from the direct care of children to fostering and adoption, renaming itself Dr Barnardo's.  Following the closure of its last traditional orphanage in 1989, it took the still simpler name of Barnardo's.

Controversies 
There was controversy early on with Barnardo's work. Specifically, he was accused of kidnapping children without parents' permission and of falsifying photographs of children to make the distinction between the period before they were rescued by Barnardo's and afterwards seem more dramatic. He openly admitted to the former of these charges, describing it as 'philanthropic abduction' and basing his defence on the idea that the end justified the means. In total, he was taken to court on 88 occasions, usually on the charge of kidnapping. However, being a charismatic speaker and popular figure, he rode through these scandals unscathed. Other charges brought against him included presenting staged images of children for Barnardo's 'before and after' cards and neglecting basic hygiene for the children under his care.

The charity today 
The official mascot of Barnardo's is a bear called Barney. H.M. Queen Elizabeth II was Barnardo's Patron from 1983 to 2016, when she handed over the role to HRH The Duchess of Cornwall.
Its chief executive is Lynn Perry.

See also
The Likes of Us
Charitable organization
Orphanage
Ragged School Museum
List of Freemasons

Notes

References 
Attribution

External links 

 British Home Child Group International – research site
 IllustratedPast.com – jahahagsgsfsfguaphotographs of a Barnardo orphanage in 1893

1845 births
1905 deaths
19th-century Irish people
Adoption, fostering, orphan care and displacement
Founders of orphanages
Irish evangelicals
Irish Protestants
Irish Freemasons
Irish people of Italian descent
Irish people of German-Jewish descent
Irish people of English descent
Philanthropists from Dublin (city)
Child welfare in the United Kingdom
Freemasons of the United Grand Lodge of England
19th-century philanthropists
Irish Protestant missionaries
Protestant missionaries in China
People of Sephardic-Jewish descent